The Mount Coke false shieldback (Acilacris furcatus) is a tettigoniid orthopteran that is endemic to a single small locality in Eastern Cape Province, South Africa. It has not been seen since its original discovery in 1965.

References

Tettigoniidae
Insects described in 1996
Critically endangered insects
Endemic insects of South Africa